Robert H. Dedman Jr. is an American heir, businessman and philanthropist.

Biography

Early life
Robert Henry Dedman Jr., was born on June 26, 1957, in Dallas, Texas. His late father was Robert H. Dedman Sr., founder of ClubCorp. His sister, Patty Dedman Dietz, sits on its board of directors. He graduated from the University of Texas at Austin with a B.A. in Economics in 1979. While at UT, he was a member of the Tejas Club. He received an M.B.A. from the Cox School of Business in 1980 and a J.D. from the Dedman School of Law in 1984, both at Southern Methodist University.

Career
He joined ClubCorp in 1980 and worked as Director of Corporate Planning from 1980 to 1984. From 1984 to 1987, he was Associate at Salomon Brothers, where he specialized in mergers and acquisitions. He served as Chief Financial Officer of ClubCorp in 1987, President from 1989 to August 2002, Chief Operating Officer from 1989 to 1997, and Chief Executive Officer from 1998 to August 2004. He served on the board of directors of Home Interiors and Gifts, JPMorgan Chase Dallas Region and the Stewart Information Services Corporation.

Philanthropy
He has served on the board of trustees of the Southwest Region of the Boys and Girls Clubs of America, the Southwestern Medical Foundation, the Dallas Museum of Art, Southern Methodist University and the University of Texas at Austin Development Board. He is past chairman of the Texas Business Hall of Fame. He chairs the 21st Century Council at SMU, where he is also a member of the Young Presidents' Organization and the Dallas Citizens Council.

Golf
As Chairman of ClubCorp, he was named one of the most influential people in golf. As a player, he has a twelve handicap, and plays twenty to twenty-five rounds a year. He serves on the President's Council of the United States Golf Association and the advisory board of The Environmental Institute for Golf. He also sits on the boards of the National Golf Foundation and Golf 20/20.

Personal life
He is married to Rachael Redecker Dedman, who earned a Master of Liberal Arts from SMU. They have two daughters, Catherine and Nancy.

Bibliography
Our Star Service Journey (1998)

References

Living people
1957 births
Businesspeople from Dallas
University of Texas at Austin College of Liberal Arts alumni
Dedman School of Law alumni
American philanthropists